Hov is the administrative centre of Søndre Land Municipality in Innlandet county, Norway. The village is located in the traditional region of Land, along the east shore of the large Randsfjorden where the Norwegian county roads 34 and 247 meet.

Hov was located along the Valdresbanen railway line. The railway connected the Gjøvikbanen railway line at Eina with the town of Fagernes in the district of Valdres. The railroad had passenger traffic from 1902 to 1988 when it was closed down.

Hov Church (Hov kirke) is a cruciform style church dating from 1781 that is located in Hov.

Notable residents
 Finn Thrana (1958–2006), lawyer
 Ola Skjølaas (1941-2006), politician
 Håvard Narum (born 1944), journalist

References

Søndre Land
Villages in Innlandet